Revatha College (also referred to as Revatha National School) is a primary and secondary school in Balapitiya, Sri Lanka.

History 
Revatha College was found in 1933 as the Galmangoda Dual Language School by then-Minister of Justice Sir Lalitha Rajapakse.

Past Principals 
Before hand-over to the government
 Mr. Sir Lalitha Rajapaksha
 Welithara Gnanarathana Thero
 Mr. Waiman Mandis Gunarathna
 Mr. G. O. T. De Silva (1933.08.01-1934.09.30)
 Mr. R. S. Perera (1934–1945)
 Mr. U. D. I. Sirisena (From 1947.09.01)
 Mr. M. Jinasena (For short period)
After hand-over to the government (1 December 1947)
 Mr. W. M. Gunarathna [Acting] (1947)
 Mr. D. J. Nanayakkara (From 1948.09.01)
 Mr. M. Wandabona (From 1951.06.01)
 Mr. P. H. Amaradasa [Acting] (From 1951)
 Mr. K. M. W. Kuruppu (From 1952.05.10)
 Mr. E. P. De Silva (From 1958.09.29)
 Mr. M. Watawala (From 1959.02.02)
 Mr. G. M. T. De Silva (1960.09.01 - 1960.12.31)
 Mr. T. Disanayaka (From 1961.01.01)
 Mr. W. D. S. Gunathilaka (From 1961.05.31)
 Mr. P. D. P. Piyathilaka (From 1964.03.01)
 Mr. W. A. Ansan (From 1971.03.31)
 Mr. M. G. A. Amarasiri (1973.05.03 – 1975.05.09)
 Mr. Padmasiri Kalutharage (1975.05.12 – 1976.05.05)
 Mr. M. G. A. Amarasiri (1976.05.05 – 1976.05.29)
 Mr. Padmasiri Kalutharage (1976.05.31 – 1976.06.14¬)
 Mr. M. W. Sumathipala (1976.06.14 – 1976.11.01)
 Mr. Somapala Mohotti (1976.11.01 – 1977.08.12)
 Mr. E. H. Premarathna (From 1977.08.17)
 Mr. A. P. I. Kariyawasam (1980.06.16 – 1986.04.29)
 Mr. Sathyapala Jayasekara (1986.04.29 – 1986.09.20)
 Mr. Wolter Udawaththa (1986.09.20 – 1990.06.04)
 Mr. D. P. De Silva (1990.06.04 – 1993.02.09)
 Mr. A. T. C. Nishshanka Gunasekara (1993.02.09 – 1996.08.03)
 Mr. D. W. Sahabandu (1996.08.03 – 1998.12.31)
 Mr. R. Ananda Weerawansha De Silva (1998.02.31 – 2004.02.24)
 Mr. N. J. De S.Hendahewa (2004.02.20 – 2005.04.15)
 Mr. G. C. De Zoysa (2005.04.15 – 2008.08.25)
 Mr. S. P. Ariyarathna (2008.08.25 – 2009.10.30)
 Mr. K. Ranjith Premathilaka (2009.10.30 – 2011.01.11)
 Mrs. Theja Deepthi Disa Weerakkodi [Acting] (2011.01.11 – 2013.08.01)
 Mr. Bandula Sarath Waduthanthri (2013.08.01 – 2016.01.20)
 Mr. D. Sirinanda (2016.01.20 - Present)

Battle of the Heroes 
The 'Battle of the Heroes' is the annual cricket encounter played between Revatha College and Siddhartha College. First played in 1987, it is now a major sporting event in the area.

Houses 
Students are divided into four houses, led by House Captains and Sports Captains. The House that gets the most points in the inter-house games is awarded the title of winning house and House Colours are awarded to winners.

The houses are:

Wijaya (Sinhala-විජය)

Color:  Blue

Gemunu (Sinhala-ගැමුණු)

Color:  Red

Mahasen (Sinhala-මහසෙන්)

Color:  Green

Parakrama (Sinhala-පරාක්‍රම)

Color:  Yellow

References 

Schools in Galle District